Vengeance of the Dead is a 1917 silent film drama directed by and starring Henry King. It was produced by the Balboa Amusement Producing Company, and distributed through General Film Company. It survives in the Library of Congress collection

Cast
Henry King 
Lillian West as Lilas Velso
Philo McCullough 
Edward Peters 
Daniel Gilfether 
Virginia Lee Corbin 
Mollie McConnell

References

External links
Vengeance of the Dead at IMDb.com

1917 films
American silent feature films
Films directed by Henry King
American black-and-white films
Silent American drama films
1917 drama films
1910s English-language films
1910s American films